A list of notable buildings and structures in Niger:

Agadez
Agadez Mosque
Taguelmoust

Niamey
Niamey Grand Mosque
Stade General Seyni Kountche
Niamey Grand Market
National Assembly of Niger
 Diori Hamani International Airport
Abdou Moumouni University
Sahel Academy
Higher Institute of Mining, Industry and Geology
National Hospital
Lamordé University Hospital.
American International School of Niamey
Lycée La Fontaine

Yaama
Yamma Mosque